The 2012 Saint Francis Red Flash football team represented Saint Francis University in the 2012 NCAA Division I FCS football season. They were led by third year head coach Chris Villarrial and played their home games at DeGol Field. They are a member of the Northeast Conference. They finished the season 5–6, 4–4 in NEC play to finish in a tie for fourth place.

Schedule

Source: Schedule

References

Saint Francis
Saint Francis Red Flash football seasons
Saint Francis Red Flash football